The 3M National Teaching Fellowship is a prestigious recognition of excellence in educational leadership and teaching at the university and college level in Canada. It is conferred by the Society for the Scholarship of Teaching and Learning. In 1986, the Society for Teaching and Learning in Higher Education (STLHE) and 3M Canada partnered to recognize exceptional contributions to teaching and learning in Canadian post-secondary education. The community of 3M National Teaching Fellows embodies the highest ideals of teaching excellence and scholarship with a commitment to encourage and support the educational experience of every learner. Up to ten Fellowships are selected annually.

Winners

See also

 List of education awards

References

Education awards